Jane Anne McDonald (born 4 April 1963) is an English singer, songwriter and television presenter. Born and raised in Wakefield, McDonald spent much of her early career performing in local clubs and pubs before landing work as a singer on cruise ships. McDonald became known to the public in 1998 following her appearance on the BBC show The Cruise. 

The same year, McDonald released her self-titled debut album Jane McDonald (1998), which topped the UK Albums Chart and remained there for 3 weeks. McDonald has had a total of four top 10 albums in the UK in addition to performing in live concerts and her own tours at venues across the UK, including the Royal Albert Hall and the London Palladium, as well as at the MGM Grand Las Vegas. In 2015, McDonald performed the role of Grizabella in the musical Cats.

McDonald has also co-presented a number of daytime television shows, including Loose Women between 2004 and 2014, and the ITV programme Star Treatment (2013). Her TV travel show Cruising with Jane McDonald, which debuted in 2017 on Channel 5, has spawned eight series and earned her a British Academy Television Award. She has also presented her own shows Jane & Friends, Holidaying with Jane McDonald and Jane McDonald: My Yorkshire on Channel 5.

Early life
McDonald was born in Wakefield, West Riding of Yorkshire.

Career
After appearing on Chris Terrill's docusoap The Cruise, she was taken on by independent record label Focus Music International to make a covers album and a Christmas single. The self-titled album Jane McDonald spent three weeks at number one on the UK Albums Chart, while the single "Cruise into Christmas" (a medley of Christmas classics) reached the top 10 of the UK Singles Chart. 

After her number one success on an independent label, McDonald signed a recording contract with UMTV (Universal's catalogue and compilations division), and appeared as a guest presenter on BBC's National Lottery.

Beginning in 2004, McDonald was a regular presenter on the ITV daytime television programme Loose Women, appearing on the show three times a week. It was confirmed on 16 July 2010 that McDonald would depart Loose Women in the summer, for at least a year to concentrate on her music career and to tour Australia and New Zealand. Although an Australian tour never developed into anything official, she proceeded to tour the United Kingdom in 2011. She returned in 2012 before leaving the series permanently in January 2014 to focus on her music career. She has since made many guest appearances. She continues to tour the UK with her solo shows & has introduced Christmas themed arena shows into her work schedule.

Cruising with Jane McDonald won the 2018 BAFTA Award for Best Feature, making it the first win for a Channel 5 show.

Personal life

In 1998, McDonald married Henrik, a ship's plumbing engineer, who later became her manager. Their relationship was detailed in a special edition of Terrill's docusoap, called The Cruise Special: Jane Ties the Knot, which was broadcast on BBC One on 10 July 1998. Brixen later admitted that he did not understand the music industry, and the couple split in 2003, largely for the sake of her career.

In 2008, McDonald was reunited with musician Eddie Rothe, an old acquaintance from her teenage years and a member of The Searchers. They became engaged on 24 December 2008 after Rothe proposed. Rothe died of lung cancer on 26 March 2021.

Discography

Albums

Compilation albums

Live albums

Extended plays

Singles

DVDs
Jane McDonald in Concert (1999)
Jane McDonald Live in Las Vegas (2001)
Being Jane (filmed 2005)
The Very Best of Loose Women (2008)
Late Night with the Loose Women (2009)
Jane McDonald – Live at the London Palladium (18 October 2010)
Jane McDonald - A Live Christmas Concert Special (15 November 2019) (No. 2 in the DVD music charts)

Books
Jane McDonald – Follow Your Dreams, autobiography (2000)
Jane McDonald – Riding the Waves: My Story, autobiography, Virgin Books (2019)

Awards
In 2011, Wakefield Council awarded her a star in the form of a pavement plaque for outstanding achievement from an entertainer.

In 2018, McDonald was awarded a British Academy Television Award for her television series Cruising with Jane McDonald.

Notes

References

External links
 Official website
 Jane's profile at itv.com
 Discogography at Discogs
 

1963 births
Living people
English television presenters
Television personalities from West Yorkshire
English women pop singers
People from Wakefield
20th-century English women singers
21st-century English women singers